The Cultural Landscape Foundation (TCLF) is a 501(c)(3) non-profit founded in 1998 by Charles A. Birnbaum with a mission of “connecting people to places.”

Mission
TCLF educates and engages the public to study landscapes and better understand the individuals who created them. Its website provides a search portal to a database of hundreds of pioneers of American landscape design and their built works. TCLF's catalogue of entries ranges from profiles of 19th century icons like Frederick Law Olmsted to modernist masters like Dan Kiley. As an advocate for threatened landscapes, the organization has also stopped the destruction of over 50 important gardens and landmark parks through its highly publicized annual Landslides list. Its goal is achieved through outreach and education including tours and photo exhibits about "What's Out There."

History
TCLF launched the Cornelia Hahn Oberlander International Landscape Architecture Prize in 2021, which includes a $100,000 award and two years of public engagement activities.
 Its first recipient was Julie Bargmann.

References

External links
 Official website

501(c)(3) organizations
Non-profit organizations based in the United States
Organizations established in 1998
Landscape architecture organizations